Stavrou is a Greek surname. Notable people with the surname include:

 Andreas Stavrou (born 1988), Cypriot retired footballer
 Andreas Stavrou (footballer, born 1958), Cypriot retired footballer
 Costas Stavrou (born 1965), Cypriot retired footballer
 Debbie Stavrou, English 21st century international lawn and indoor bowler
 Eleni Stavrou (born 1975), Cypriot politician
 Nick Stavrou (born 1969), English football coach and former player
 Nicos Stavrou (born 1971), Cypriot retired footballer
 Yannis Stavrou (born 1948), Greek artist

Greek-language surnames
Patronymic surnames
Surnames from given names